Rudolf Nébald (born 7 September 1952) is a Hungarian fencer who won a bronze medal in the team sabre competition at the 1980 Summer Olympics in Moscow together with György Nébald, Ferenc Hammang, Imre Gedővári and Pál Gerevich.

References

1952 births
Living people
Hungarian male sabre fencers
Fencers at the 1980 Summer Olympics
Olympic fencers of Hungary
Olympic bronze medalists for Hungary
Fencers from Budapest
Olympic medalists in fencing
Medalists at the 1980 Summer Olympics